Lee Jong-Min (born 1 September 1983) is a retired South Korean footballer.

Club career statistics

Honors

Club
Suwon Samsung Bluewings
 K League (1) : 2004
 FA Cup (1) : 2002
 Asian Club Championship (1) : 2002
 Asian Super Cup (1) : 2002

Ulsan Hyundai
 K League (1) : 2005
 League Cup (1) : 2007
 Korean Super Cup (1) : 2006
 A3 Champions Cup (1) : 2006

FC Seoul
 K League (1) : 2010
 League Cup (1) : 2010

References

External links

Lee Jong-min – National Team stats at KFA 

 

1983 births
Living people
Association football midfielders
South Korean footballers
South Korea international footballers
Suwon Samsung Bluewings players
Ulsan Hyundai FC players
FC Seoul players
Gimcheon Sangmu FC players
Gwangju FC players
Busan IPark players
K League 1 players
K League 2 players
Footballers at the 2006 Asian Games
Asian Games competitors for South Korea
Sportspeople from Jeju Province